Ebenus cretica, common name Cretan ebony, is a leguminous small shrub in the family Fabaceae.

Description

These flowers bloom from late March to June.

Distribution
This species is native to the Mediterranean island of Crete.

References 
 Encyclopedia of Life entry
 
 J.C. Vlahos and M. Dragassaki Propagation of Cretan Silver Bush (Ebenus cretica L.), A Potential New Flower Crop

External links
 West Crete

Hedysareae
Flora of Crete
Plants described in 1753
Taxa named by Carl Linnaeus